Harder Than Easy is singer-songwriter Jack Savoretti's second studio album, released for digital distribution by De Angelis Records on 15 September 2009 in the United States.

Recording
Harder Than Easy was recorded over seven days in Los Angeles at Jackson Browne's studio with members of Tom Waits' band (Larry Taylor and Steve Hodges) and Counting Crows (Charlie Gillingham and David Immergluck). It was mixed by Jack Joseph Puig (U2, Snow Patrol, John Mayer).

Track listing
"Map of the World"
"Wonder"
"Northern Sky"
"Lost America" 
"Mother"
"Songs from Different Times"
"Russian Roulette" 
"Breaking News"
"Harder Than Easy"
"Patriot"

Personnel
Jack Savoretti - Acoustic Guitar

Production
Rick Barraclough - Producer
Jack Joseph Puig - Mixing

References

2009 albums
Jack Savoretti albums